Clutch is the second full-length album by American rock band Clutch. It was released in May 1995.

Recording and release
It saw the return of "Uncle Punchy" Lawrence Packer to the production of the album and a return to Uncle Punchy Studios in Silver Spring, Maryland. It is the band's best-selling album in the US, at over 138,730 copies to date. The album gets regular live coverage still, with at least half the track list making their live performances on a regular basis, well over 20 years later.

Background 
This album captures the band's MO of trying out new styles and genres, with a definable mix of funk metal in the songs this time around. The album is considered to be the point where the band had begun to evolve their stoner and blues rock know-how. The record also keeps with their punk metal credentials, containing some heavier tracks. The album is considered a staple of the 1990s stoner rock genre. The album features some of their more 'spacey' pieces such as "Big News", "Escape from the Prison Planet", "I Have the Body of John Wilkes Booth", and "Spacegrass".

Track listing
All music and lyrics written by Clutch.

The Japanese release of the album contains an extra track, "Apache", which was initially released on the radio only promotional EP 'Big News', along with a demo version of "Spacegrass", which has never been reissued to date. It would appear on the bootleg 'Clutch: Rarities and B-Side' some years later.

Personnel
 Neil Fallon - vocals
 Tim Sult – guitar
 Dan Maines – bass
 Jean-Paul Gaster – drums
 Richard Morel – organ (on tracks 5, 7, 12 and 13)

Production 
 Production & Engineering by Larry "Uncle Punchy" Packer at Uncle Punchy Studios in Silver Spring, Maryland
 Mixing by Steve Thompson, Michael Barbiero & Jay Ryan - "Uncle Punchy" on tracks 3 and 8
 Assistant engineering by Mike Hamady & Jay Ryan
 Digital engineering by Danio Saratak
 Mastered by Greg Calbi
 A and R representation by Wendy Berry
 Management by Jon Goldwater
 Photography by Dan Winters
 Design by Jennifer Roddie
 3-D Typography by Rob Eberhardt

Charting positions
Album

References

1995 albums
Clutch (band) albums
East West Records albums
Funk metal albums